Shivangi Pathak is an Indian mountaineer born in Hisar, Haryana in August 2002. At age 16, she became India's youngest person to climb the world's highest peak, Mount Everest, on 16 May 2018 from the Nepal side. She climbed Russia's highest peak Mount Elbrus in Europe on 2 September 2018.  She also climbed the highest peak of Africa, Mount Kilimanjaro, on 24 July 2018 at the age of 17.

Early life
Pathak was born in Hisar of Haryana in north-western India.

Everest climb 
Training for climbing Mt. Everest, included climbing Stok Khangri, a 6,053-metre peak in Ladakh.
On 17 May 2018 become the youngest Indian woman to climb the Mount Everest

Her ascent of the peak began in April 2018 from the Nepal base camp of Everest, the entire Everest expedition took one month.

Awards 
She was honored with the Bal Shakti Puraskar 2019.

References 

Indian female mountain climbers
Living people
2002 births
People from Hisar (city)
Mountain climbers from Haryana
Indian summiters of Mount Everest
Date of birth missing (living people)